That's Just the Way I Want to Be is a 1970 album by Blossom Dearie. For the first time, the focus is on Dearie as a songwriter with her co-writing nine of the album's 12 tracks. She took the opportunity to pay tribute to some of her contemporaries: John Lennon (the object of her praise in "Hey John"), Georgie Fame and Dusty Springfield. The last song, "I Like London In The Rain", contains an opening breakbeat that has been sampled by hip hop producers.

Track listing
"That's Just the Way I Want to Be" – 3:48
"Long Daddy Green" (Blossom Dearie, Dave Frishberg) – 3:23
"Sweet Surprise" – 3:18
"Hey John" – 3:31
"Sweet Georgie Fame" (Dearie, Sandra Harris) – 3:24
"Both Sides Now" (Joni Mitchell) – 3.19
"Dusty Springfield" (Dearie, Jim Council, Norma Tanega) – 1.55
"Will There Really Be a Morning" (John Wallowitch, Emily Dickinson) – 3.07
"I Know the Moon" – 3:28
"Inside a Silent Tear" (Dearie, Peter King) – 2:16
"Yesterday When I Was Young" (Charles Aznavour, Herbert Kretzmer) – 5:11
"I Like London in the Rain" – 2:39

All songs by Blossom Dearie and Jim Council, except as indicated.

Personnel
Blossom Dearie – piano, vocals
Ian Carr – flugelhorn
Jeff Clyne – bass
Harold McNair – flute, tenor saxophone
Daryl Runswick – bass
Ray Warleigh – flute
Spike Wells – drums
Kenny Wheeler – trumpet
The Ladybirds – voices
The Hooray String Section – strings
Brian Gascoigne – orchestrations

References

1970 albums
Blossom Dearie albums
Fontana Records albums